The bushy-tailed mongoose (Bdeogale crassicauda) is a mammal in the family Herpestidae found in central Africa, from southern Kenya to central Mozambique.

Characteristics 
The bushy-tailed mongoose has a greyish to yellowish brown fur. Its head is rounded.
It has short woolly ears and a plush muzzle. Its tail is wide and bushy.

Taxonomy 

 B. c. crassicauda, central Mozambique, Malawi and Zambia
 B. c. nigrescens, Central Kenya (Nairobi)
 B. c. omnivora, found in northern coastal Tanzania and Kenya
 B. c. puisa, northern Mozambique and southern Tanzania
 B. c. tenuis

Phylogeny 
The bushy tailed mongoose is closely related to the black-footed mongoose (Bdeogale nigripes). Perez's study of genes within the family Herpestidae showed the genus Bdeogale is monophyletic. Close cousins of this clade include the genera Ichneumia and Cynictis.

Distribution and habitat 
Because of the bushy-tailed mongoose's size and stealthiness, its range is not completely known. Although, it apparently prefers locations near rivers that provide cover.
The bushy-tailed mongoose inhabits foremost open shrubland and multilayered forest. These habitats vary little in temperature and humidity.
In northern Tanzania, the bushy-tailed mongoose was recorded in more than 31 camera trap locations in Ngorongoro Conservation Area, Biharamulo-Burigi-Kimisi Game Reserve and Mahale Mountains National Park, mostly in Acacia woodlands and riparian zones.

Conservation 
The bushy-tailed mongoose is listed as Least Concern on the IUCN Red List. It is negatively impacted by habitat degradation and fragmentation, prey depletion and land use dynamics caused by cattle grazing.

References

External links 
 Bushy-tailed mongoose, Tanzanian Mammal Atlas Project

bushy-tailed mongoose
Mammals of Malawi
Mammals of Mozambique
Mammals of Tanzania
Mammals of Zimbabwe
Fauna of East Africa
bushy-tailed mongoose
bushy-tailed mongoose